Once Over Lightly is a 1957 album by Jo Stafford. On this album she is accompanied by the Art Van Damme Quintet. Once Over Lightly was released on the Columbia label.

Track listing 

 "Almost Like Being in Love" (Frederick Loewe, Alan Jay Lerner) - 2:50
 "A Foggy Day" (George Gershwin, Ira Gershwin) - 3:06
 "The Lady Is a Tramp" (Richard Rodgers, Lorenz Hart) - 2:49
 "These Foolish Things" (Jack Strachey, Eric Maschwitz) - 3:25
 "Mine" (George Gershwin, Ira Gershwin) - 2:30
 "The Gypsy in My Soul" (Clay Boland, Moe Jaffe) - 3:27
 "Autumn Leaves" (Joseph Kosma, Jacques Prévert, Johnny Mercer) - 3:03
 "You're Mine, You" (Johnny Green, Edward Heyman) - 2:18
 "Nice Work If You Can Get It" (George Gershwin, Ira Gershwin) - 1:52
 "My Old Flame" (Arthur Johnston, Sam Coslow) -3:19
 "But Not for Me" (George Gershwin, Ira Gershwin) - 3:14     
 "One for My Baby" (Harold Arlen, Johnny Mercer) - 3:49

References 

1957 albums
Jo Stafford albums
Columbia Records albums